Max Jones (born February 17, 1998) is an American professional ice hockey forward who is currently playing for the  Anaheim Ducks of the National Hockey League (NHL). Jones was drafted by the Ducks 24th overall in the 2016 NHL Entry Draft.

Playing career

Junior hockey

U.S. National Development Team Program
Growing up in Rochester, Michigan, Jones played in the renowned junior Honeybaked Hockey program before joining the U.S National Development Team.
Jones suited up for the U.S. National Development Team during the 2014–15 season. In 24 games in the USHL, Jones scored five goals and 10 points, while earning 116 penalty minutes. Jones also appeared in 38 games with the U17 team, scoring 18 goals and 28 points, as well as earning 189 penalty minutes.

London Knights
Jones was selected by the London Knights of the OHL in the first round, 18th overall, in the 2014 OHL Priority Selection. Jones joined the Knights for the 2015–16 season.

Jones appeared in his first career OHL game on September 25, 2015, being held off the score sheet in a 5–3 win over the Hamilton Bulldogs. On October 4, Jones earned his first career OHL point, an assist, in a 5–2 victory over the Oshawa Generals. In his seventh career OHL game, Jones scored his first goal, as he put the puck past Sault Ste. Marie Greyhounds goaltender Brandon Halverson in a 7–2 win on October 17. One week later, on October 24, Jones earned his first career OHL hat trick, as he scored three goals, including the overtime winner, in a 4–3 win over the North Bay Battalion. On October 31, Jones notched another hat trick, in a 7–0 win over the Saginaw Spirit. Overall, Jones finished his rookie season with 28 goals and 52 points in 63 games, helping the Knights to a 105-point season and a third-place finish in the Western Conference. Jones made his post-season debut on March 25, 2016, scoring a goal against Michael McNiven of the Owen Sound Attack, and adding an assist, in a 4–1 Knights victory. On March 30, Jones was involved in an incident in which he would earn a 12-game suspension from the OHL for a blind-side bodycheck on Justin Barack of the Attack. Jones returned from his suspension to play in the third game of the Knights J. Ross Robertson Cup final series against the Niagara IceDogs. Jones helped the Knights clinch the championship, as London swept Niagara in four games, to earn a berth in the 2016 Memorial Cup.

At the 2016 Memorial Cup, Jones played in the Knights opening game against the Red Deer Rebels on May 20, however, he was held off the score sheet in a 6–2 win. On May 23, Jones scored his first career Memorial Cup goal against Jordan Papirny, and added an assist, in a 9–1 win over the Brandon Wheat Kings. The Knights advanced to the Memorial Cup final, and Jones earned an assist in a 3–2 victory over the Rouyn-Noranda Huskies, as London won the Memorial Cup.

Jones returned to the Knights for the 2016–17 season after being assigned to the club by the Anaheim Ducks. On October 24, Jones set a career-high with four points, as he scored two goals and assisted on two others, in a 5–1 Knights victory over the Saginaw Spirit. Jones suffered through an injury-plagued season, appearing in only 33 games, however, he scored 17 goals and 36 points, helping London reach the post-season. In the playoffs, Jones scored seven goals and 12 points in 14 games, as London lost to the Erie Otters in the Western Conference final.

Jones began the 2017–18 season with the Knights. On October 20, Jones earned a hat trick in a 5–1 win over the Kitchener Rangers. On December 10, Jones tied his career-high for points in a game, scoring twice and earning two assists in a 6–2 victory over the Erie Otters. On January 7, 2018, the Knights traded Jones to the Kingston Frontenacs in exchange for Sergey Popov, a second-round draft pick in 2023, and a third-round draft pick in 2021. Jones played in 25 games with the Knights, scoring 18 goals and 21 points.

Kingston Frontenacs
Jones made his debut with the Kingston Frontenacs on January 12, 2018, earning no points in a 4–2 loss to the Guelph Storm. In his next game with Kingston, Jones scored his first goal with the club, beating Cole Ceci of the Oshawa Generals, and added two assists in a 4–1 win over the Oshawa Generals. On January 21, Jones suffered a broken thumb in a game against the Mississauga Steelheads, sidelining him for the remainder of the regular season. In six games with Kingston, Jones had a goal and two assists. In the post-season, Jones missed the first seven games due to his injury, however, he made his playoff debut with Kingston on April 8, earning no points in a 4–2 win over the Barrie Colts. On April 12, Jones scored his first playoff goal for the Frontenacs, scoring the opening goal against Leo Lazarev in a 7–1 win. In nine playoff games with Kingston, Jones scored three goals and four points, as the Frontenacs lost to the Hamilton Bulldogs in the Eastern Conference final.

Professional career

Anaheim Ducks
Jones was drafted by the Anaheim Ducks in the first round, 24th overall, in the 2016 NHL Entry Draft held at the First Niagara Center in Buffalo, New York. Following the elimination of his junior club, the London Knights, in the 2017 OHL playoffs, the Ducks assigned Jones to their AHL affiliate, the San Diego Gulls for the remainder of the playoffs.

Jones appeared in his first career AHL playoff game on April 22, 2017, earning no points in a 2–1 win over the Ontario Reign. On May 10, Jones scored his first professional goal against Troy Grosenick of the San Jose Barracuda in a 4–3 overtime loss. In nine post-season games, Jones scored a goal and an assist.

Jones started the 2018–19 season with the Ducks' AHL affiliate the San Diego Gulls, but on January 16, 2019 he was called up to the NHL. The next night he made his debut, helping the Ducks to a 3–0 win against the Minnesota Wild at Xcel Energy Center in Saint Paul.

Personal life
Jones' father Brad is a former player who played 148 NHL games with 3 different teams (Winnipeg Jets, Los Angeles Kings and Philadelphia Flyers). Despite being from Michigan, he is a full supporter of the Bills Mafia, as seen with his WJC eyeblack.

Career statistics

Regular season and playoffs

International

References

External links
 

1998 births
Living people
American men's ice hockey left wingers
Anaheim Ducks draft picks
Anaheim Ducks players
Ice hockey players from Michigan
Kingston Frontenacs players
London Knights players
National Hockey League first-round draft picks
People from Rochester, Michigan
San Diego Gulls (AHL) players
USA Hockey National Team Development Program players